Periploca arsa is a moth in the family Cosmopterigidae. It was described by Ronald W. Hodges in 1978. It is found in North America, where it has been recorded from Florida.

References

Moths described in 1978
Chrysopeleiinae
Taxa named by Ronald W. Hodges
Moths of North America